Stanley Benjamin Kirsch, Jr. (July 15, 1968 – January 11, 2020) was an American actor, screenwriter, director, and acting coach.

Biography
Kirsch was born in New York City, New York. He began acting as a young child. His first acting job was at the age of 4 when he appeared in some Campbell's soup television commercials. Kirsch appeared in the short-lived Saturday morning TV series Riders in the Sky and on the soap opera General Hospital in 1992. He has made guest appearances in some TV shows including JAG, Family Law, and Friends.

His most notable role began in 1992 on Highlander: The Series as Richie Ryan. He left the show as a regular cast member in the fifth season finale in 1997, but he made one last guest appearance in the series finale episode, "Not To Be" which aired May 17, 1998.

Kirsch made his debut as director and producer with the film Straight Eye: The Movie in 2004. In 2008, he founded his own acting studio called Stan Kirsch Studios.

On January 11, 2020, 51-year-old Kirsch was found dead in his Los Angeles home. The LA Coroner ruled Kirsch's death a suicide by hanging.

Selected filmography

Film
1998: Reason Thirteen (Short) as Michael
1999: Shark in a Bottle as Punk #1
2000: The Flunky as Sammy Bestone
2004: Shallow Ground as Stuart Dempsey
2004: Straight Eye: The Movie (Short, writer, director) as Sonny
2005: Deep Rescue as Kevin

Television 
1991: Riders in the Sky as Axl (1991)
1992–1997: Highlander: The Series as Richie Ryan
1992: CBS Schoolbreak Special as Steve
1992: The Streets of Beverly Hills (TV Movie) as Kenny Street
1995: Friends as Ethan
1995: ABC Afterschool Special as Matt
1996–2001: JAG as Lieutenant Ferrari / Ensign Frank Cody
1996: Home Song (TV Movie) as Kent Arens
1998: The Sky's On Fire (TV Movie) as Chuck
1999: Love Boat: The Next Wave as Vince
1999: Beyond Belief, fact or fiction
2000: Family Law as Rick Quinn
2002: First Monday as David Dahl Washington Post Reporter
2021: Invincible as Robot & Red Rush

References

External links

1968 births
20th-century American male actors
21st-century American male actors
American male soap opera actors
American male television actors
Male actors from New York City
American male screenwriters
American film directors
Screenwriters from New York (state)
Suicides by hanging in California
2020 suicides
2020 deaths